Lars-Eric Lundvall (3 April 1934 – 8 April 2020) was a Swedish professional ice hockey player and coach. Between 1956 and 1965 he played 195 international matches and scored 79 goals. During this period he won 5 world and 10 European championship medals, including world and European titles in 1957 and 1962; he also took part in the 1956, 1960 and 1964 Olympics and finished in fourth, fifth and second place, respectively.

Domestically Lundvall won two Swedish titles: with Södertälje SK in 1956 and with Västra Frölunda IF in 1965. He was selected to the Swedish all-star team in 1959 and 1960.

After retiring from competitions in 1968, Lundvall stayed as a coach with his last club Västra Frölunda IF. He also ran a gas station with his long-term teammate Ronald Pettersson. He died in 2020, aged 86.

References

External links

1934 births
2020 deaths
Frölunda HC players
Ice hockey players at the 1956 Winter Olympics
Ice hockey players at the 1960 Winter Olympics
Ice hockey players at the 1964 Winter Olympics
Medalists at the 1964 Winter Olympics
Olympic ice hockey players of Sweden
Olympic medalists in ice hockey
Olympic silver medalists for Sweden
People from Karlskoga Municipality
Swedish ice hockey coaches
Swedish ice hockey left wingers
Sportspeople from Örebro County
20th-century Swedish people